Komysh-Zoria is an urban-type settlement in Polohy Raion of Zaporizhzhia Oblast in Ukraine. It is located in the steppe between Zaporizhzhia and Mariupol. Komish-Zoria hosts the administration of Komysh-Zoria settlement hromada, one of the hromadas of Ukraine. Population: 

Until 18 July 2020, Komysh-Zoria belonged to Bilmak Raion. The raion was abolished in July 2020 as part of the administrative reform of Ukraine, which reduced the number of raions of Zaporizhzhia Oblast to five. The area of Bilmak Raion was merged into Polohy Raion.

Economy

Transportation
Komysh-Zoria railway station is a railway junction which is connected with Zaporizhzhia via Polohy, Melitopol via Tokmak, and Mariupol. There is some passenger traffic.

The settlement has access to Highway H08 connecting Zaporizhzhia and Mariupol.

References

Urban-type settlements in Polohy Raion